Pagamsürengiin "Pati" Altantulga (born 5 February 1988) is a Mongolian international footballer. He has appeared 3 times for the Mongolia national football team.

References

1988 births
Living people
Mongolian footballers
Association football midfielders
Mongolia international footballers